The Environmental Working Group (EWG) is an American activist group that specializes in research and advocacy in the areas of agricultural subsidies, toxic chemicals, drinking water pollutants, and corporate accountability. EWG is a nonprofit organization (501(c)(3)).

Founded in 1993 by Ken Cook and Richard Wiles, EWG is headquartered in Washington, D.C., in the United States. A sister lobbying organization, the EWG Action Fund (a 501(c)(4) organization) was founded in 2002.

The accuracy of EWG reports and statements have been criticized, as has its funding by the organic food industry. Its warnings have been labeled "alarmist", "scaremongering" and "misleading". Despite the criticism, EWG has been influential.

Activities
The EWG issues various product safety warnings. Environmental historian James McWilliams has described these warnings as fear mongering and misleading, and wrote that there is little evidence to support the claims made by the EWG.

"The transparency of the USDA’s program in providing the detailed data is good because it reveals how insignificant these residues are from a health perspective. Unfortunately, the EWG misuses that transparency in a manipulative way to drive their fear-based, organic marketing agenda."

According to Kavin Senapathy of Science Moms, the EWG "frightens consumers about chemicals and their safety, cloaking fear mongering in a clever disguise of caring and empowerment." Senapathy included two main areas of criticism for the organization including: methodologies used by the EWG for "food, cosmetics, children’s products and more are fundamentally flawed", and the EWG is largely funded by organic companies and does not assess or discuss pesticides from organic farming.

Quackwatch describes EWG as one of "[t]he key groups that have wrong things to say about cosmetic products".

Dirty Dozen
EWG's "Dirty Dozen" list describes food additives that have been associated with adverse health impacts, including some additives that have been restricted in certain countries.

Critics of the Dirty Dozen list have suggested that it significantly overstates the risk to consumers of the listed items, and that the methodology employed in constructing the list "lacks scientific credibility".

A 2011 study showed that the items on the list had safe levels of chemical residue or none at all. A 2011 analysis of the USDA's PDP data by Steve Savage found that 99.33% of the detectable residues were below the EPA tolerance and half of the samples were more than 100 times below.

Sunscreens
In July 2008, the EWG first published an analysis of over 900 sunscreens. The report concluded that only 15% of the sunscreens met the group's criteria for safety and effectiveness. Representatives of the sunscreen industry called the 2008 sunscreen report inaccurate. Commenting on the 2010 sunscreen report, Zoe Draelos, of Duke University and spokesperson for the American Academy of Dermatology, said the group made unfair "sweeping generalizations" in its report and their recommendations were based on "very old technology".

Finances and funding
For the fiscal year ending December 2015, EWG raised nearly $13.7 million and spent $12.5 million. Over 84 cents out of every dollar go toward EWG's program expenses. President Ken Cook earned $289,022 in reportable income in 2015.

References

External links
 Environmental Working Group

Environmental organizations based in Washington, D.C.
Charities based in Washington, D.C.

es:Control de emisiones vehiculares